Isla de Mona e Islote Monito is an island-barrio of Mayagüez, Puerto Rico. The US census of 2000 reports six housing units, but a population of zero.  The barrio is made up of the islands of Mona and Monito.  In 2010, there was a population of 5. This is the largest ward of Mayagüez by area. The total land area of both islands in the barrio is about 56.93 km2 (Mona Island 56.783 km2 and nearby Monito Island 0.147 km2), and it comprises 28.3 percent of the total land area of the municipality of Mayagüez. Desecheo Island, 49 km to the northeast, is part of Sabanetas barrio.  The Mona Island Lighthouse is located in the ward.  Isla de Mona e Islote Monito is surrounded by the Mona Passage.

History
Puerto Rico was ceded by Spain in the aftermath of the Spanish–American War under the terms of the Treaty of Paris of 1898 and became an unincorporated territory of the United States. In 1899, the United States Department of War conducted a census of Puerto Rico finding that the population of Mona was 6.

See also

 List of communities in Puerto Rico

References

External links
 

Barrios of Mayagüez, Puerto Rico